Oumar Diaby (born 7 February 1990) is a French former professional footballer who played as a forward. After developing at Real Sociedad in Spain, he has featured for clubs in his native country as well as in Bulgaria, Slovakia and Scotland.

Career
Diaby was the first French player to move to the Real Sociedad academy at the age of 12 in 2002, which paved the way for other French players, including Antoine Griezmann. 

In October 2012, he signed a three-year contract with MFK Košice. He made his debut for Košice against Dukla Banská Bystrica on 1 December 2012.

He signed for Scottish club Hamilton Academical in February 2016. He spoke about his problems with racism while he was playing in Slovakia and Bulgaria. In May 2016 it was announced that he would leave Hamilton at the end of the 2015–16 season.

After taking a break from football, in 2018 Diaby signed for amateurs Balma, based on the outskirts of Toulouse where his partner was studying.

References

External links
MFK Košice profile
Corgoň Liga profile

Eurofotbal profile
 Profile at LevskiSofia.info

1990 births
Living people
French footballers
Sportspeople from Bayonne
French-Basque people
French sportspeople of Malian descent
Black French sportspeople
Association football forwards
Real Sociedad B footballers
LB Châteauroux players
Genêts Anglet players
RCO Agde players
FC VSS Košice players
PFC Levski Sofia players
Hamilton Academical F.C. players
Balma SC players
Slovak Super Liga players
First Professional Football League (Bulgaria) players
French expatriate sportspeople in Spain
Scottish Professional Football League players
Expatriate footballers in Spain
Expatriate footballers in Slovakia
Expatriate footballers in Bulgaria
Expatriate footballers in Scotland
French expatriate sportspeople in Scotland
French expatriate sportspeople in Slovakia
French expatriate sportspeople in Bulgaria
Footballers from Nouvelle-Aquitaine